Saori is a feminine Japanese given name.

Saori may also refer to:

Saori, Aichi, a former town in Ama District, Aichi Prefecture, Japan
Saori (video game), a 1991 video game
Saori (television personality), Japanese-Korean television personality

See also
Saori@destiny, Japanese musician